The Northern Territory is a self governing territory of Australia. Official population statistics are published by the Australian Bureau of Statistics, which conducts a census every five years. The most recent census for which data has been released is the 2021 census.

Urban centres and localities by population 
SA1's are areas that subdivide all of Australia, and have a population between 200 and 800 people and an average population size of 400. Urban centres and localities are defined by the Australian Bureau of Statistics to be clusters of urban SA1's. Clusters with a population higher than 1,000 are considered urban centres and clusters with a population between 200 and 999 are considered localities.

Local government areas by population 
The Northern Territory is divided into 17 local government areas plus several unincorporated areas.

See also 

 List of cities in Australia by population
 List of places in New South Wales by population
 List of places in Queensland by population
 List of places in South Australia by population
 List of places in Tasmania by population
 List of places in Victoria by population
 List of places in Western Australia by population

Notes

References 

Lists of populated places in Australia
Northern Territory-related lists